Blådalsvatnet is a glacial lake in the municipality of Kvinnherad in Vestland county, Norway. The lake is formed by the glacial runoff from the large Folgefonna glacier located just north of the lake. The lake is part of the water system used to power the Blåfalli kraftverk hydroelectric power station.

See also
List of lakes in Norway

References

Kvinnherad
Lakes of Vestland